The lava rock mountain snail (Oreohelix waltoni) is a species of land snail in the family Oreohelicidae. It is also known as Walton's banded mountain snail. It is endemic to Idaho in the United States, where it is known from just a few locations on the Salmon River.

References

Natural history of Idaho
Oreohelicidae
Gastropods described in 1975
Taxonomy articles created by Polbot